Welcome Freshmen is an American comedy series that aired on Nickelodeon from February 16, 1991, to February 19, 1994. The show took place at Hawthorne High School with a group of high school students and a bumbling vice principal.

Seasons 1 and 2
The earlier episodes of the series consisted of comedy sketches that loosely followed a theme. Some of the comedy routines involved a tortoise named Mortise teaching children about safety, a historian named Mr. History who talks about past generations of freshmen, the bumbling, freshman-hating, vice-principal Mr. Lippman imagining himself as a stand-up comedian telling really bad old jokes that insult freshmen, and a student named Billy Cushman who, though his appearance was occasional, provided not only a good example of how not to behave but also a good example of flatulence.

Each episode had two or three short skits about the gang's misadventures in high school.

Recurring skits
 Home-Room Announcements-Mr. Lippman, the vice-principal, doing the morning announcements (at the same time, imagining how he'd really like to say them as a stand-up format).
 The Merv-U-Mentary-Merv's amateurish attempt at uncovering news and scandals at the high school.
 Mr. History-featuring the gang as high school students of a past time period.
 Mike Who-featuring close-ups of a sidelined high school basketball player driving the crowd wild with a single wave. Eventually cut after vice Principal Lippman said it was too distracting, resulting in a tense showdown between Lippman and Who.
 Mortise the Safety Tortoise

Season 3
In the later episodes, the sketch comedy format was abandoned and Welcome Freshmen became a standard sitcom.

In the third season, except Walter who flunked and was held behind. Merv and Tara left. Merv skipped the rest of high school, going straight to college. Tara and her family moved to a Biosphere. New characters came in: Manny, Erin and Grant, who was Erin's brother and soon became Alex's boyfriend. Eventually, Walter moves up as the teachers all threatened to quit if they had him another year.

Production
The show's first television pilot was filmed in May 1990, featuring a group of local actors in the main roles, among them was future Backstreet Boys member Howie Dorough. After the success of the pilot, the show was picked up, but the roles were recast, according to series creator Bob Mittenthal "Those kids did a good job, the proof is that the show was picked up as a series , but research told Nickelodeon it needed better-defined characters".

Cast
 Rick Galloway as Walter Patterson
 Chris Lobban as Kevin St. James
 David Rhoden as Merv (1991–1992)
 Jill Setter as Tara (1991–1992)
 Jocelyn Steiner as Alex Moore
 Brock Bradley as Grant Kelly (1993–1994)
 Arian Waring Ash as Erin Kelly (1993–1994)
 Nicholas Caruso as Manny Barrington (1993–1994)
 Mike Speller as Mr. Elliott Lippman
 Veronica Alicino as Miss Topaz
 Janis Benson as Miss Petruka
 Nick Barnes as Billy Cushman
 Phil Card as Mr. History
 Tracy Frenkel as Coach Roach and Coach Rochelle
 Jay Martel as Mr. Royd
 Al Arasim as Al Patterson 
 John Parker Searles as Mr. Macbroom
 Mark Sarto as Mortise, the Safety Tortoise

Characters

Main characters
Walter Patterson: the dim-witted, good-natured, optimistic, lazy and laid-backgeekt slacker of the group who loves eating. His stupidity and clumsiness are often the butt of jokes.
Kevin St. James: the cynical, selfish, and egotistical one of the group. He is a smooth talker, a terrible ladies' man, and often makes fun of his friends especially Merv, Manny, and Walter. Mostly he is troublemaker of the group.
Merv: the confident, outgoing, and nerd of the group. Merv is a nerdy guy. 
Tara: the eco-conscious feminist activist of the group. Besides Walter, she is among the nicest of the group though she joins in making fun of others at times.
Alex Moore: a beautiful, popular and fashion-obsessed girly girl. Often vain, Snobby, rude and materialistic, she is obsessed with her status and has no issues manipulating others for personal gain.
Mr. Elliott Lippman: the tyrannical and incompetent principal of Hawthorne High. He often serves as an antagonist to the main characters' schemes though they do not take him seriously.

Additional characters
Grant Kelly: Erin's brother, a junior who becomes Alex's boyfriend. Introduced in the final season. 
Erin Kelly: a musically talented freshman who often dresses in a grunge fashion. Introduced in the final season.
Manny Barrington: introduced in the final season, a naive and short-statured nerdy freshman. He befriends the main group who are a grade above him despite them treating him poorly and laughing at his expense.

Series overview

Episodes

Season 1 (1991)

Season 2 (1992)

Season 3 (1993–94)

References

External links
 
 Jump The Shark - Welcome Freshmen

1990s American children's comedy television series
1990s American high school television series
1990s American sketch comedy television series
1990s American teen sitcoms
1990s Nickelodeon original programming
1991 American television series debuts
1994 American television series endings
Children's sketch comedy
English-language television shows
Television series about teenagers
Television series created by Robert Mittenthal
Television shows filmed in Florida